Alberta Provincial Highway No. 1A is the designation of two alternate routes off the Alberta portion of Trans-Canada Highway 1. However, it is not the only name used for spurs off Highway 1 - Highway 1X is another such designation. Despite these highways being suffixed routes of Highway 1, they are not part of the Trans-Canada Highway network, and are signed with Alberta's provincial primary highway shields instead of the Trans-Canada shields used for Highway 1.

Bow Valley Parkway 
The Lake Louise to Banff section of the Banff National Park 1A route is also known as the Bow Valley Parkway. It provides more immediate access to attractions in Banff National Park such as Castle Mountain and Johnston Canyon.

Parks Canada introduced planned and marked pullovers along the route to enhance and educate visitors about the region. The Bow Valley Parkway is one of only two parkways between Lake Louise and Banff, and the only one that allows views of the mountain scenery, waterfalls, and various view points of the nearby rivers and creeks. It was the original highway that connected the valley and is advertised as a "year-round scenic heritage experience".

Parks Canada enacted seasonal travel restrictions along the Bow Valley Parkway on a  segment between the Johnston Canyon Campground and the Fireside Picnic Area (adjacent to the Highway 1 eastern junction).  From March 1 to June 25, travel is not permitted between 8 p.m. and 8 a.m. in order to protect wildlife.  Highway 1 can be used as an alternate route.

In 2022, Parks Canada announced a three-year pilot project that would see the 17-km eastern portion of the Parkway, between the eastern junction with the Trans-Canada Highway and Johnson Canyon, closed to all vehicular traffic, except for bicycles, between March 1 and June 25, and from Sept. 1 to 30.

Major intersections 
Starting from the west end of Highway 1A:

Bow Valley Trail 

The second of the 1A routes, known as the Bow Valley Trail, begins in Canmore, off of the Trans-Canada Highway at exit 91. It formerly began at the Trans-Canada Highway at exit 86 and passed through Canmore; however, ownership of the section was transferred to the Town of Canmore.  The roadway still carries the name "Bow Valley Trail".

From exit 91, it heads eastbound, along the Canadian Pacific Railway tracks, until it reaches the Hamlet of Exshaw.  From Exshaw, Bow Valley Trail heads to the northeast, past Highway 1X.

Highway 1A passes Morley approximately eight kilometres from the eastern boundary of the area; the community is situated just south of the highway. Shortly after resuming its normal speed limit, the highway skirts the north shore of Ghost Lake, a manmade glacier lake that is a popular spot for Calgary's boating and sailing enthusiasts in the summer, as well as ice sailing in the winter. The lake also supplies most of the water power for Calgary through TransAlta Utilities. Highway 1A meets northbound Highway 40 approximately  after passing Ghost Lake.

From Highway 40, Bow Valley Trail proceeds towards the east, and then slightly to the southeast, before reaching the Town of Cochrane, where it intersects with Highway 22. Upon reaching the Calgary city limits at 12 Mile Coulee Road, it continues as Crowchild Trail, a major north-south expressway, (although it travels in a southeasterly direction from the city limits to 24 Avenue NW) through the northwest and southwest parts of the city. Within Calgary, it crosses Stoney Trail (Highway 201) as well as a number of major streets, before reuniting with the Trans-Canada Highway (known as 16 Avenue N) near McMahon Stadium and the University of Calgary. The section along Crowchild Trail is maintained by the City of Calgary rather than Alberta Transportation.

Before 1972, this route was the only road to Banff National Park.

Major intersections 
Starting from the west end of Highway 1A:

Former alignments

Icefields Parkway 

When initially constructed, the Icefields Parkway was designated as Highway 1A between Lake Louise and Jasper.  The route was renumbered to Highway 93 in 1959.

Kicking Horse Pass 

A former section of Highway 1A exists along the former Kicking Horse Trail, the original road between Lake Louise and Golden, British Columbia that opened in 1926. When the Trans-Canada Highway was realigned in 1962, the segment became Highway 1A. It meandered eastward through Kicking Horse Pass to Lake Louise, generally paralleling the main Highway 1 and CPR rail line to the south. The section between Lake Louise (townsite) and Lake Louise (lake) is known as Lake Louise Drive, while the remainder of route is now closed to vehicle traffic and is part the Great Divide hiking trail.

17 Avenue SE 

Highway 1A used to be an alternate route that followed 17 Avenue SE in Calgary and linked with Highway 1 in Chestermere.  It began at Highway 2 (Deerfoot Trail) and Blackfoot Trail interchange and continued east along 17 Avenue SE where it passed through the former town of Forest Lawn. It crossed 116 Street SE, entering Chestermere and terminated at the Highway 1 interchange.  It was dropped by the province in 2013 and the section within Chestermere was renamed to Chestermere Boulevard.  As of 2016, remnant Highway 1A signage still remains on Deerfoot Trail and sections of 17 Avenue SE within Calgary; however, it has been removed along Stoney Trail, through Chestermere, and along the Trans-Canada Highway.

Downtown Calgary 

The existing Bow Valley Trail / Crowchild Trail section and former 17 Avenue SE section of Highway 1A used to be connected by following a series of streets through inner-city Calgary.  From its present terminus, Highway 1A followed 16 Avenue NW east and was cosigned with Highway 1 to 14 Street NW.  Highway 1A turned south, and after crossing the Bow River using the Mewata Bridge, and then branches east at its interchange Bow Trail.  Highway 1A passed through downtown Calgary on a pair of one-way streets, with eastbound traffic following 9 Avenue S and westbound traffic following 6 Avenue S.  East of 6 Street SE, both directions of Highway 1A followed 9 Avenue SE, crossing the Elbow River on the Inglewood Bridge and passing through the community of Inglewood, linking with eastern section of Highway 1A by either using 16 Street SE and Blackfoot Trail, or directly along 17 Avenue SE.  This section of Highway 1A was dropped in the 1970s.

Brooks – Medicine Hat 

A former alignment of the Trans-Canada Highway between Brooks and Medicine Hat, through County of Newell and Cypress County, is locally referred to as Highway 1A. Running parallel to Highway 1, it runs to the south along the Canadian Pacific Railway mainline. The road is paved between Brooks and Highway 875, with long-term plans to pave it to Tilley, as well as some sections around Suffield. Between Tilley and Suffield, the road has both gravel and unimproved sections and serves as a local ranch-access road. Once in Cypress County, it is referred to as the Old Trans-Canada Highway, while in Redcliff and Medicine Hat, it goes by South Railway Avenue and Saamis Drive.

Despite the Highway 1A name, the route is maintained by the local municipalities and is not part of the provincial highway system.

Highway 1X 

It serves as the only Bow River crossing between Canmore to the west and Morley to the east, providing access to First Nations lands and communities in the area. At  in length, it is one of Alberta's shortest provincial highways.

Future 

Highway 1X is the designation of two proposed bypasses around Strathmore and Medicine Hat. The project would also feature a realignment of Highway 24 to follow Highway 817 between Carseland and Strathmore. Both bypasses are currently unfunded with no timeline for construction. Once the bypasses are completed, they would be signed as part of Highway 1.

Major intersections

References 

001A
Roads in Calgary
Former segments of the Trans-Canada Highway